A.E. "Abe" Lemons (November 21, 1922 – September 2, 2002) was an American college basketball player and coach. As a head coach at Oklahoma City University, Pan American University and the University of Texas at Austin, he compiled a record of 594–343 in 34 seasons.

Early life
Lemons was born in Ryan, Oklahoma and given the initials-only name "A.E."  He grew up in the town of Walters, Oklahoma and graduated from Walters High School in the spring of 1941.

Lemons earned a basketball scholarship to play for Southwestern Oklahoma Teachers College (now known as Southwestern Oklahoma State University). and their long-time coach Rankin Williams.

After the United States entered World War II in December 1941, Lemons joined the Merchant Marine. He served in the Pacific and often referred to the pressures of his war experience to put sports into perspective.

After the war, Lemons enrolled at Hardin College, which had just added a four-year senior college in 1946.  He was a 6-foot 4-inch center/forward for the Indians, who finished 4-15 under first-year head coach Fermon "Red" Rutledge, during the 1946–47 season.

In 1947, Lemons transferred to Oklahoma City University (OCU) where he played two years for coach Doyle Parrack. In 1947–48, the Chiefs had an 18–13 record, which improved to 20–6 in 1948–49.

Coaching career

Oklahoma City University
Lemons was hired in 1955 to coach at his alma mater. He would coach the program until 1973 in his first tenure there. During that time, the team went 309–181 while making the NIT twice while appearing in the NCAA tournament seven times (1956, 1957, 1963–1966, and 1973). Oklahoma City also won the All-College Tournament in 1965. Lemons coached several All-America & future NBA players, such as Arnold Short  and Hub Reed.

Pan American University
From 1973 to 1976, Lemons was head coach at Pan American University, where he was named 1974–75 Texas Coach of the Year and coached the nation's leading scorer in Marshall Rogers.

University of Texas
Lemons took the head coaching position at the University of Texas in 1976.  He served as president of the National Association of Basketball Coaches in 1977 and was named National Coach of the Year in 1978.  Lemons' last season at Texas was 1981–82.  In March 1978, Lemons led the University of Texas to the championship of the NIT with a victory over North Carolina State.

Lemons became beloved across all of his jobs for his witticisms, but at his most prominent job, Texas, he made a number of notable quotes that made him popular among the fanbase. The Longhorns would enjoy a minor blip in national prominence under Lemons, with the aforementioned NIT championship and an NCAA Tournament appearance in 1979.

Return to Oklahoma City University
Lemons returned to Oklahoma City University in 1983. In his second stint at the program, Lemons took the Chiefs (now known as the Stars) to the NAIA Championship tournament once and to the District IX playoffs four times.  Lemons was Sooner Athletic Conference Coach of the Year in 1985–1986.  OCU had an undefeated season record and a trip to the NAIA tournament in 1986–1987.  That year, they were ranked number one throughout the season.  The season ended with a 34–1 record, Lemons was named District 9 Coach of the Year and Sooner Athletic Conference Coach of the Year.  In 1987, he was named Basketball Times Coach of the Year. In 1989, he received the Jim Thorpe Lifetime Achievement Award.

During his 25 years with OCU, Lemons posted a record of 432–264. He brought positive national attention to the state of Oklahoma, Oklahoma City, and OCU. He established himself as a "teacher of men," not only in sports, but in the values of life, as proven by the success and leadership accomplishments of his students and players. In 1990, Lemons was inducted into the Oklahoma Sports Hall of Fame.

Personal life and death
Lemons married Betty Jo Bills, and they had two daughters, Dana and Jan.

Lemons died on September 2, 2002 of complications from Parkinson's disease at the age of 79.

Head coaching record

References

1922 births
2002 deaths
American men's basketball coaches
American men's basketball players
United States Merchant Mariners of World War II
Basketball coaches from Oklahoma
Basketball players from Oklahoma
College men's basketball head coaches in the United States
Neurological disease deaths in Oklahoma
Deaths from Parkinson's disease
Midwestern State Mustangs men's basketball players
Oklahoma City Stars men's basketball coaches
Oklahoma City Stars men's basketball players
People from Ryan, Oklahoma
People from Walters, Oklahoma
Southwestern Oklahoma State Bulldogs men's basketball players
Texas Longhorns men's basketball coaches
UT Rio Grande Valley Vaqueros men's basketball coaches
Centers (basketball)
Forwards (basketball)